İlkay is a common unisex Turkish given name. "İlkay" is composed of two words: "İlk" and "Ay". In Turkish, "İlk" means "first", and/or "prime", whereas "ay" means "moon". Thus, İlkay means "new moon".

Given name
 İlkay Dikmen (born 1981), Turkish female Olympian swimmer
 İlkay Durmuş (born 1994), Turkish male footballer
 İlkay Gündoğan (born 1990), German male footballer of Turkish descent
 İlkay Özdemir (born 1981), Turkish female performer of stage magic
 Ilkay Silk (born 1948), Cypriot-born British and Canadian theatre artist

Turkish unisex given names